CTP may refer to:

Science and technology
 Cyclohexylthiophthalimide, used in the production of rubber
 Cytidine triphosphate, a pyrimidine nucleotide
 Child-Turcotte-Pugh score of chronic liver disease.

Computing
 Community Technology Preview of software
 Computer to plate, in lithographic printing
 SNIA Conformance Testing Program (SNIA-CTP), in storage networking
 Collection Tree Protocol for wireless sensor networks
 Canadian traveller problem, a shortest path problem

Organizations
 Cambridge Technology Partners, US consulting company 1991-2001
 Concern Tractor Plants, a Russian machine building company
 MIT Center for Theoretical Physics
 Confederación de Trabajadores del Perú, a trade union center in Peru
 Republican Turkish Party (Cumhuriyetçi Türk Partisi), Northern Cyprus
 Tashkent Aircraft Production Corporation, Uzbekistan, ICAO airline designator; see Airline codes-T

People
 Cristian Tudor Popescu (born 1956), Romanian journalist and writer

Transportation
 Certified Transportation Professional, US credential overseen by National Private Truck Council
 Chisholm Trail Parkway, Dallas-Fort Worth area, US
 Compania de Transport Public Cluj-Napoca, public transit operator in Cluj-Napoca, Romania
 Compania de Transport Public (CTP) Iași, public transit operator in Iași, Romania

Other uses
Certified Treasury Professional, certification of the Association for Financial Professionals
 Convergence Technologies Professional
 Compulsory Third Party insurance, Australian vehicle insurance
 Caxton and CTP Publishers and Printers Limited of South Africa
 Chinese Text Project, a digital library project